Zaur Hikmat oglu Guliyev is an Azerbaijani military officer, captain 1st rank of the marines of the Azerbaijani Navy, which is part of the Azerbaijani Armed Forces. He had participated in the 2020 Nagorno-Karabakh war, and had received the title of the Hero of the Patriotic War.

Military service 
Zaur Hikmat oglu Guliyev currently serves in the Marine Infantry Battalion of the Azerbaijani Naval Forces as the captain 1st rank.

During the 2020 Nagorno-Karabakh war, Zaur Guliyev and his squad took part in the Aras Valley campaign and the Lachin offensive. In the latter, Guliyev led his squad in the battle over the city of Gubadly, and several villages in the Gubadly District. On 26 October 2020, the President of Azerbaijan, Ilham Aliyev, congratulated Zaur Guliyev and his squad on their military activity in the city of Gubadly and the surrounding villages.

On 10 December 2020, during the Victory Parade in Baku on the occasion of the Azerbaijani victory in the war, the ceremonial squad of the marines of the Azerbaijani Naval Forces, led by Zaur Guliyev, also marched along the other military formations that took part in the war.

Awards 
 Guliyev was awarded the Hero of the Patriotic War on 9 December 2020, by the decree of the President of Azerbaijan, Ilham Aliyev.
 Guliyev was awarded the For the Liberation of Jabrayil Medal on 24 December 2020, by the decree of the President Aliyev.
 Guliyev was awarded the For the Liberation of Fuzuli Medal on 25 December 2020, by the decree of the President Aliyev.
 Guliyev was awarded the For the Liberation of Khojavend Medal on 25 December 2020, by the decree of the President Aliyev.
 Guliyev was awarded the For the Liberation of Gubadly Medal on 29 December 2020, by the decree of the President Aliyev.

References 

Azerbaijani Marines officers
Heroes of the Patriotic War
Living people
Azerbaijani Navy personnel of the 2020 Nagorno-Karabakh war
Year of birth missing (living people)